Maves is a surname. Notable people with the surname include:

Bart Maves (born 1964), Canadian politician 
Earl Maves (1923–1952), American football player